The men's singles competition of the 2019 World Table Tennis Championships was held from 23 to 28 April 2019.

Ma Long defended his title by defeating Mattias Falck 11–5, 11–7, 7–11, 11–9, 11–5 in the final.

Seeds

  Fan Zhendong (fourth round)
  Xu Xin (third round)
  Lin Gaoyuan (quarterfinals)
  Tomokazu Harimoto (fourth round)
  Timo Boll (fourth round)
  Lee Sang-su (fourth round)
  Hugo Calderano (fourth round)
  Koki Niwa (quarterfinals)
  Liang Jingkun (semifinals)
  Jang Woo-jin (quarterfinals)
  Ma Long (champion)
  Dimitrij Ovtcharov (third round)
  Jun Mizutani (third round)
  Wong Chun Ting (first round)
  Liam Pitchford (second round)
  Mattias Falck (final)
  Patrick Franziska (third round)
  Vladimir Samsonov (third round)
  Chuang Chih-yuan (second round)
  Lin Yun-ju (second round)
  Jeoung Young-sik (fourth round)
  Quadri Aruna (third round)
  Marcos Freitas (third round)
  Sathiyan Gnanasekaran (third round)
  Daniel Habesohn (third round)
  Chen Chien-an (first round)
  Emmanuel Lebesson (third round)
  Kristian Karlsson (second round)
  Simon Gauzy (quarterfinals)
  Tristan Flore (first round)
  Jonathan Groth (third round)
  Sharath Kamal (second round)
  Kanak Jha (second round)
  Ovidiu Ionescu (first round)
  Gustavo Tsuboi (first round)
  Darko Jorgić (second round)
  Bojan Tokič (second round)
  Masataka Morizono (third round)
  Panagiotis Gionis (third round)
  Omar Assar (first round)
  Robert Gardos (second round)
  Kazuhiro Yoshimura (second round)
  Álvaro Robles (first round)
  Ľubomír Pištej (second round)
  Kirill Gerassimenko (first round)
  Tiago Apolónia (third round)
  Cédric Nuytinck (second round)
  João Monteiro (second round)
  Wang Yang (fourth round)
  Tomislav Pucar (fourth round)
  Nima Alamian (second round)
  Stefan Fegerl (second round)
  Pavel Širůček (second round)
  Noshad Alamian (first round)
  Alexander Shibaev (first round)
  Can Akkuzu (second round)
  Kou Lei (second round)
  Jon Persson (second round)
  Benedek Oláh (second round)
  Niagol Stoyanov (first round)
  Eric Jouti (second round)
  Kirill Skachkov (first round)
  Lubomír Jančařík (second round)
  Ho Kwan Kit (first round)

Draw

Finals

Top half

Section 1

Section 2

Section 3

Section 4

Bottom half

Section 5

Section 6

Section 7

Section 8

References

External links
Draw

Men's singles